USS Awatobi (YTB-264) was a harbor tugboat acquired by the United States Navy during the close of World War II. She was outfitted with two .50-caliber machine guns and assigned to the San Francisco Bay area where she provided tug services, and other harbor services as required.

Constructed at Tacoma, Washington 

Awatobi (YT-264) was laid down on 27 March 1944 at Tacoma, Washington, by the J.M. Martinac Shipbuilding Corp.; reclassified a large harbor tug and redesignated YTB-264 on 15 May 1944; launched on 30 September 1944; and placed in service on 1 February 1945.

World War II service 

Awatobi served out her entire naval career as a harbor tug in the 12th Naval District in the San Francisco Bay area of California.

Decommissioning and deactivation 

She was deactivated in 1960, and her name was stricken from the Navy list in December 1960. The details of her disposition are not available.

References
 
 Awatobi (YTB-264), 1945–1960
 NavSource Online: YT-264 / YTB-264 Awatobi

World War II auxiliary ships of the United States
Tugs of the United States Navy
Ships built in Tacoma, Washington
1944 ships